Yuan Chunqing (born March 1952) is a retired Chinese politician. He was deputy chief of the Office for Rural Work and the Communist Party Chief of Shanxi province. Prior to that, he was Governor of neighbouring Shaanxi province.

Biography 
Yuan was born in Hanshou County, Hunan Province. He graduated from the department of law of Peking University, and obtained a master's degree in law from the China University of Political Science and Law in 1990, as well as a doctoral degree in management from the international business school of Hunan University. Yuan joined the central organization of the Communist Youth League (CYL) shortly after graduating from Peking University. He worked there for 17 years. In October 1997, Yuan was named a standing committee member of the Central Commission for Discipline Inspection, taking up his first major role outside of the CYL. At the CCDI he became widely known for announcing the results of the investigation into the "Yuanhua scandal" in Xiamen involving tycoon Lai Changxing.

In 2001 he was transferred to work in Shaanxi province as deputy party chief. Beginning in January 2004 he was named party chief of Xi'an. While in Xi'an Yuan was known to have released a white paper about the city's development, and became one of the "most watched municipal party chiefs in the country." In 2006, he succeeded Chen Deming as the Governor of Shaanxi. He seemed destined for even higher office. On May 31, 2010, Yuan was named party chief of the coal-producing neighboring province of Shanxi. Yuan was abruptly transferred out of office as party chief of Shanxi in September 2014 during the "great Shanxi political earthquake". He was then named one of the deputy chiefs of the Office for Rural Work, presumably maintaining his full provincial rank until October 2017.

He has been an alternate member of the 16th Central Committee of the Communist Party of China and a full member of the 17th and 18th Central Committees.

Works
An Overview of Reform and Development in China and Overseas
The Transformation of Small-scale Economics in China
Symbiosis Theory: Comments on Small-scale Economics
Financial Symbiosis Theory and Reform of City Commercial Banks

References 

Living people
1952 births
People's Republic of China politicians from Hunan
Politicians from Changde
Chinese Communist Party politicians from Hunan
Political office-holders in Shanxi
Governors of Shaanxi
Communist Party secretaries of Xi'an
Deputy Communist Party secretaries of Shaanxi